Friedhelm Hillebrand is a German engineer who has been influential in setting mobile telecommunications standards. Hillebrand is one of the inventors of the SMS, as he and Frenchman Bernard Ghillebaert created the concept for the service in 1984. As chairman of the non-voice services committee for the Global System for Mobile Communications standard in 1985, he conducted experiments to determine the length needed for text messages and found that 160 characters was sufficient.  This subsequently became the basis for the 140 character limit now used by Twitter.

He was born in Warstein in 1940, and as a child, was active in amateur radio. He gained a master's degree in telecommunications in 1968, then started his career with the German post office, which was then also responsible for telephones. After retiring from that career, he started a consultancy advising on technology patents.

References

1940 births
Living people
Engineers from North Rhine-Westphalia
Text messaging
People from Warstein